Rao Bahadur Hosakote Krishna Sastri (16 September 1870 – 8 February 1928) was an Indian epigraphist with the Archaeological Survey of India (ASI). He is known for his work in deciphering Brahmi inscriptions of Asoka at Maski and inscriptions of the Pallavas.  Sastri  edited volumes XVII, XVIII and XIX of ‘’Epigraphia Indica’’   and authored a book titled "South Indian images of Gods and Goddesses".

Krishna Sastri was also known for his pioneering work in deciphering Tamil-Brahmi inscriptions. In a 1919 paper co-authored with K. V. Subrahmanya Aiyar, Sastri identified Tamil words in the Brahmi inscription found at Mangulam.

References

External links
 

1870 births
1928 deaths
Indian epigraphers
Archaeological Survey of India people
19th-century Indian historians
20th-century Indian linguists
Scientists from Karnataka